China Review International, A Journal of Reviews of Scholarly Literature in Chinese Studies is a journal that aims to present English-language reviews of innovative and relevant Chinese studies related books from within and outside of China.

The journal was established in 1994 by Roger T. Ames (University of Hawaiʻi). The journal is published quarterly by the University of Hawaiʻi Press. Its first electronic edition appeared in 2000 on Project MUSE.

References

External links 

Journal page on Project Muse

Journal page on the University of Hawaiʻi Presswebsite

English-language journals
Publications established in 1994
Chinese studies journals
Biannual journals
University of Hawaiʻi Press academic journals